Victoria Muniz (born January 25, 1989, Agana Heights, Guam) is an American figure skater who skated internationally for Puerto Rico. She qualified to the free skate at three ISU Championships — 2007 Junior Worlds, 2011 Four Continents, and 2012 Four Continents. She is a four-time Puerto Rican national champion, having won the title in 2005, 2007, 2009, and 2011.

Muniz competed on the ISU Junior Grand Prix circuit for two seasons. She made her senior debut at the 2008 World Championships in Gothenburg, Sweden, and went on to compete in the 2009 World Championships in Los Angeles, her training town. Muniz was the first skater to represent Puerto Rico at an ISU Championship, doing so at the 2006 World Junior Championships.

Programs

Results 
JGP: Junior Grand Prix

References

External links 

 
  Puerto Rican Skating Federation-Athletes Page

1989 births
Living people
Puerto Rican figure skaters
American female single skaters
People from Agana Heights, Guam